Frederick Adam Diment (born 1943) is a spy novelist who published four novels between 1967 and 1971. All four are about the adventures of Philip McAlpine whom critic Anthony Boucher described as "an agent who smokes hashish, leads a highly active sex life, kills vividly, uses (or even coins) the latest London slang and still seems a perfectly real (and even oddly likeable) young man rather than a reflected Bond image."

A film version of The Dolly Dolly Spy with David Hemmings playing McAlpine was scheduled to go into production but was never made. 

Diment disappeared from public view after his last novel, adding to his cult figure status among fans of 1960s spy novels. According to The Observer, by 1975 Diment was living in Zurich, shunning publicity, and had no plans to write further novels.  A publisher is attempting to re-issue his books via a crowdfunding scheme.

Novels
 The Dolly Dolly Spy (1967)
 The Great Spy Race (1968)
 The Bang Bang Birds (1968)
 Think, Inc (1971)

References

External links
 Life Magazine photos of Diment
 Brief overview of Diment's novels with cover art
 Whatever happened to Adam Diment?
 Blog mention of film adaptation of The Dolly Dolly Spy
 "The disappearance of the author Adam Diment"

English spy fiction writers
1943 births
Living people